The Hit may refer to:

Books
 The Hit (novel), a 2013 novel by David Baldacci
The Hit, a 2013 novel by Melvin Burgess
The Hit, a 1957 novel by Julian Mayfield
The Hit, a 2009 novel by Patrick Quinlan

Film and television
 The Hit (1984 film), a 1984 feature film directed by Stephen Frears
 The Hit (1981 film), a 1981 Czechoslovak comedy film directed by Zdeněk Podskalský
 Schlager (film), English title The Hit,   an Israeli comic musical film of 1979
 The Hit (Irish TV series), an Irish reality TV series
 The Hit (South Korean TV series), a Korean music mash up TV series

Music
 "The Hit", a song on the album by Bang Camaro II by Bang Camaro

Sports
 The Hit, a November 20, 1960 tackle by Chuck Bednarik of the Philadelphia Eagles on Frank Gifford of the New York Giants, which knocked Gifford unconscious and is considered one of the hardest hits in the history of the National Football League

See also
 Hit (disambiguation)
 The Hit Factory (disambiguation)